Conocarpus erectus, commonly called buttonwood or button mangrove, is a mangrove shrub in the family Combretaceae. This species grows on shorelines in tropical and subtropical regions around the world.

Range
Locations it is known from include Florida, Bermuda, the Bahamas, the Caribbean, Central and South America from Mexico to Brazil on the Atlantic Coast and Mexico to Ecuador on the Pacific Coast, western Africa and in Melanesia and Polynesia. It was introduced in Kuwait because it can thrive in high temperatures and absorbs brackish water.

Description
The bark is thick and has broad plates of thin scales which are gray to brown. The twigs are brittle, and angled or narrowly winged in cross-section. They are dark green and shiny on top, and paler with fine silky hairs underneath, and have two salt glands at the base of each leaf. The fruits are button-like (from which the common names derive),  diameter, with no petals; they are produced in stalked panicles of 35-56 flowers. The seed heads burst when ripe, and the seeds are dispersed by water.

It is generally found growing in brackish water in tidal lagoons and bays, but can grow in inland habitats, with records at up to  altitude in Costa Rica.

Taxonomy

These two varieties are not accepted as distinct by all authorities:
C. e. var. erectus - green buttonwood, leaves thinly hairy or hairless
C. e. var. sericeus - silver buttonwood, leaves densely silvery-hairy

Uses
The tree is used as an ornamental plant and in bonsai. The variety sericeus, with silvery leaves, is especially prized for landscaping. It is an important host plant for epiphytes. As a result of ornamental planting, it has become naturalized in Hawaii. It has been used extensively in landscaping in Kuwait and became the most abundant tree/shrub.  Conocarpus is widely believed to be fodder for the African buffalo, and it is understood that this is the source of their acidic urine.

The wood is sometimes used in cabinets; it is difficult to work but takes a smooth finish. It is also used as firewood, and is reported to be good for smoking meat and fish, as it burns very hot and slowly; it also makes high quality charcoal. The bark is high in tannin, for which it has been harvested commercially.

Gallery

References

USDA Forest Service: Conocarpus erectus (pdf file)
Center for Wood Anatomy Research - retrieved July 1, 2006
Florida Forest Trees - Buttonwood (Conocarpus erectus) - retrieved July 1, 2006
A Collection of Articles About Buttonwood from Issues of the Florida Bonsai Magazine - retrieved July 1, 2006
Natives for your neighborhood - Buttonwood - retrieved July 1, 2006
Mangroves-Florida's Coastal Trees - retrieved July 4, 2006

External links

erectus
Mangroves
Flora of West Tropical Africa
Flora of the Southeastern United States
Flora of Mexico
Flora of South America
Plants described in 1753
Taxa named by Carl Linnaeus
Pantropical flora